Pseudocatharylla argenticilia is a moth in the family Crambidae. It was described by George Hampson in 1919. It is found in Cameroon, the Central African Republic, Ghana, Guinea, Nigeria and Sierra Leone.

References

Crambinae
Moths described in 1919